is a Japanese manga series written and illustrated by Rumiko Takahashi. It was serialized in Weekly Shōnen Sunday from August 1987 to March 1996, with the chapters collected into 38 tankōbon volumes by Shogakukan. The story revolves around a teenage boy named Ranma Saotome who has trained in martial arts since early childhood. As a result of an accident during a training journey, he is cursed to become a girl when exposed to cold water, while hot water changes him back into a boy. Throughout the series Ranma seeks out a way to rid himself of his curse, while his friends, enemies and many fiancées constantly hinder and interfere.

Ranma ½ has a comedic formula and a sex-changing main character, who often willfully transforms into a girl to advance his goals. The series also contains many other characters, whose intricate relationships with each other, unusual characteristics, and eccentric personalities drive most of the stories. Although the characters and their relationships are complicated, they rarely change once they are firmly introduced and settled into the series.

In addition, they developed 12 original video animations and three films. In 2011, a live-action television special was produced and aired on Nippon Television. The manga and anime series were licensed by Viz Media for English-language releases in North America. Madman Entertainment released the manga, part of the anime series and the first two films in Australasia, while MVM Films released the first two films in the United Kingdom.

The Ranma ½ manga has over 55 million copies in circulation, making it one of the best-selling manga series. Both the manga and anime are cited as among the first in their respective media to have become popular in the United States.

Plot

The cursed spring causes any afflicted to assume the physical form of whatever drowned there hundreds or thousands of years ago whenever they come into contact with cold water, which reverts on contact with hot water but resumes with exposure to cold water. Genma fell into the spring of a drowned panda while Ranma fell into the spring of a drowned girl.

Genma and Soun agreed years ago that their children would marry and carry on the Tendo Dojo. Soun has three teenaged daughters: the polite and easygoing Kasumi, the greedy and indifferent Nabiki and the short-tempered, martial arts practicing Akane. Akane, who is Ranma's age, is appointed for bridal duty by her sisters with the reasoning that they are the older sisters and can dump the duty on her, and that they all dislike the arranged engagement and think Akane's dislike of men is the right way to express it to the fathers. At the appointed time they are surprised when a panda comes in and puts a girl in front of their father. The Tendo girls all laugh. It takes several more pages for the situation to be explained to Soun Tendo and his daughters. Both Ranma and Akane refuse the engagement initially, having not been consulted on the decision, but the fathers are insistent and they are generally treated as betrothed and end up helping or saving each other on some occasions. They are frequently found in each other's company and are constantly arguing in their trademark awkward love-hate manner that is a franchise focus.

Nerima serves as a backdrop for more martial arts mayhem with the introduction of Ranma's regular rivals, such as the eternally lost Ryoga Hibiki who traveled halfway across Japan getting from the front of his house to the back, where Ranma spent three days waiting for him. Ryoga, seeking revenge on Ranma, followed him to Jusenkyo where he ultimately fell into the Spring of the Drowned Piglet. Now when splashed with cold water he takes the form of a little black pig. Not knowing this, Akane takes the piglet as a pet and names it P-chan, but Ranma knows and hates him for keeping this secret and taking advantage of the situation. Another rival is the nearsighted Mousse, who also fell into a cursed spring and becomes a duck when he gets wet, and finally, there is Genma and Soun's impish grand master, Happosai, who spends his time stealing the underwear of schoolgirls.

Ranma's prospective paramours include the martial arts rhythmic gymnastics champion (and Tatewaki's sister) Kodachi Kuno, and his second fiancée and childhood friend Ukyo Kuonji the okonomiyaki vendor, along with the Chinese Amazon Shampoo, supported by her great-grandmother Cologne. As the series progresses, the school becomes more eccentric with the return of the demented, Hawaii-obsessed Principal Kuno and the placement of the power-leeching alternating child/adult Hinako Ninomiya as Ranma's English teacher. Ranma's indecision in choosing his true love causes chaos in his romantic and school life.

Production
Rumiko Takahashi stated that Ranma ½ was conceived to be a martial arts manga that connects all aspects of everyday life to martial arts. Because her previous series had female protagonists, the author decided that she wanted a male this time. However, she was worried about writing a male main character, and therefore decided to make him half-female. Before deciding on water for initiating his changes, she considered Ranma changing every time he was punched. It was after deciding this that she felt Jusenkyo had to be set in China, as it is the only place that could have such mysterious springs. She drew inspiration for Ranma ½ from a variety of real-world objects. Some of the places frequently seen in the series are modeled after actual locations in Nerima, Tokyo (both the home of Takahashi and the setting of Ranma ½).

In a 1990 interview with Amazing Heroes, Takahashi stated that she had four assistants that draw the backgrounds, panel lines and tone, while she creates the story and layout, and pencils and inks the characters. All her assistants are female; Takahashi stated that "I don't use male assistants so that the girls will work more seriously if they aren't worried about boys." In 1992, she explained her process as beginning with laying out the chapter in the evening so as to finish it by dawn, and resting for a day before calling her assistants. They finish it in two or three nights, usually utilizing five days for a chapter.

Takahashi purposefully aimed the series to be popular with women and children. In 1993, an Animerica interviewer talking with Takahashi asked her if she intended the sex-changing theme "as an effort to enlighten a male-dominated society." Takahashi said that she does not think in terms of societal agendas and that she created the Ranma ½ concept from simply wanting "a simple, fun idea". She added that she, as a woman and while recalling what manga she liked to read as a child, felt that "humans turning into animals might also be fun and märchenhaft... you know, like a fairy tale." In 2013, she revealed that at the start of Ranma her editor told her to make it more dramatic, but she felt that was something she could not do. However, she admitted that drama did start to appear at the end. She also sat in on the voice actor auditions for the anime, where she insisted that male and female Ranma be voiced by different actors whose gender corresponded to that of the part.

Media

Manga

Written and illustrated by Rumiko Takahashi, Ranma ½ began publication in the shōnen manga anthology Weekly Shōnen Sunday issue #36 published on August 19, 1987, following the ending of her series Urusei Yatsura. From August 1987 until March 1996, the manga was published on a near weekly basis with the occasional colored page to spruce up the usually black and white stories. After nearly a decade of storylines, the final chapter was published in Weekly Shōnen Sunday issue #12 on March 6, 1996. The 407 chapters were periodically collected and published by Shogakukan into a total of 38 black and white tankōbon volumes from 1988 to 1996. They were reassembled into 38 shinsōban from April 2002 to October 2003.

North American publisher Viz Media originally released Ranma ½ in a monthly comic book format that contained two chapters each from 1992 to 2003, and had the images "flipped" to read left-to-right, causing the art to be mirrored. These were periodically collected into graphic novels. On March 18, 2004, after releasing 21 volumes, Viz announced that it would reprint a number of its graphic novels. The content remained the same, but the novels moved to a smaller format with different covers and a price drop. Each volume covers roughly the same amount of material as the Japanese volumes, but retained its left-to-right format and had minor differences in grouping so that it spans 36 volumes rather than the original 38. The final volume was released in stores on November 14, 2006, thus making it Viz's longest running manga, spanning over 13 years. At Anime Expo on July 7, 2013, Viz Media announced re-release of the manga in a format that combines two individual volumes into a single large one, and restores the original right-to-left reading order (a first in North America for this series). The first 2-in-1 book (volumes 1-2) was published on March 11, 2014; the final (volumes 35-36) in January, 2017. As of July 27, 2021, VIZ has released all 19 2-in-1 books digitally. Madman Entertainment publishes the two-in-one version in Australasia.

Together with Spriggan, it was the first manga published in Portugal, by Texto Editora in 1995.

Anime series

An anime television series was created by Studio Deen and aired weekly between April 15, 1989, and September 16, 1989, on Fuji TV for 18 episodes, before being canceled due to low ratings. The series was then reworked by most of the same staff, retitled  and launched in a different time slot, running for 143 episodes from October 20, 1989, to September 25, 1992. The anime stays true to the original manga but does differ by keeping Ranma's gender transformation a secret from the high school students, at least throughout most of its length. It also does not introduce Hikaru Gosunkugi until very late in the series, instead, Sasuke Sarugakure, the diminutive ninja retainer of the Kuno family fills a number of Gosunkugi's roles in early storylines but is a major character in his own right. The anime also alters the placement of many story arcs and contains numerous original episodes and characters not adapted from the manga.

Viz Media licensed both anime series in 1993, making Ranma ½ one of the first anime titles licensed by Viz. The English dub produced for the series was recorded by The Ocean Group in Vancouver, British Columbia. They released the series on VHS from their own Viz Video label, and on DVD a few years later in association with Pioneer Home Entertainment. Their releases collected both anime series as one, separated episodes into what they call "seasons", and changed the ordering of many of the episodes. Viz themselves re-released it on DVD in 2007 using their own DVD production company. At Otakon 2013, Viz announced that they re-acquired the TV series for Blu-ray and DVD release in 2014. The show is streamed on their anime channel service Neon Alley since Autumn 2013. In September 2020, Toonami co-creator Jason DeMarco revealed that he had previously tried to get Ranma ½ aired on the American TV programming block, but "it's something we never were able to figure out, because, frankly, there's too much nudity." Madman Entertainment licensed some of the series for release in Australasia, although their rights expired after releasing only the first four "seasons" as one series.

Films and original video animations

Studio Deen also created three theatrical films; The Battle of Nekonron, China! A Battle to Defy the Rules! on November 2, 1991; Battle at Togenkyo! Get Back the Brides on August 1, 1992; and Super Indiscriminate Decisive Battle! Team Ranma vs. the Legendary Phoenix on August 20, 1994. The first two films are feature length, but the third was originally shown in theaters with two other films: Ghost Sweeper Mikami and Heisei Dog Stories: Bow.

Following the ending of the TV series, 11 original video animations were released directly to home video, the earliest on December 7, 1993, and the eleventh on June 4, 1996. All but one are based on stories originally in the manga. Twelve years later, a Ranma animation was created for the "It's a Rumic World" exhibition of Rumiko Takahashi's artwork. Based on the "Nightmare! Incense of Deep Sleep" manga story from volume 34, it was shown on odd numbered days at the exhibition in Tokyo from July 30 to August 11, 2008. But it was not released until January 29, 2010, when it was put in a DVD box set with the Urusei Yatsura and Inuyasha specials that premiered at the same exhibit. It was then released on DVD and Blu-ray by itself on October 20, 2010. Viz Media also licensed all three films, and the original 11 OVAs for distribution in North America (however they released the third film as an OVA). MVM Films has released the first two films in the United Kingdom, while Madman Entertainment released them in Australasia.

Video games

There have been fifteen video games based on the Ranma ½ franchise. While most are fighting games, there have been several RPGs and puzzle games. Only two have been released in Western countries. Ranma ½: Chōnai Gekitōhen was released in the US as Street Combat; the characters were Americanized, having their appearances completely changed, and the music was changed as well. However, Ranma ½: Hard Battle was released in both North America and Europe unaltered.

Live action special

A live action television adaption of Ranma ½ aired on Nippon TV, in a two-hour time-slot, on December 9, 2011. Although it was initially reported that the special would contain an original story, the film does take its main plot from one of the manga's early stories with several other early scenes mixed in. The special stars Yui Aragaki as Akane, with Kento Kaku and Natsuna Watanabe playing male and female Ranma respectively. Ryōsei Tayama is cast as the antagonist, the new original character Okamada. The all-girl pop group 9nine contribute "Chikutaku☆2Nite" as the theme song. It was released on both DVD and Blu-ray on March 21, 2012.

Other media
The Ranma ½ Memorial Book was published just as the manga ended in 1996. Acting as an end-cap to the series, it collects various illustrations from the series, features an interview with Takahashi, and includes tidbits about Ranma: summaries of his battles, his daily schedule, trivia, and a few exclusive illustrations. 
A Movie + OVA Visual Comic was released to illustrate the theatrical film Super Indiscriminate Decisive Battle! Team Ranma vs. the Legendary Phoenix and the OVA episodes The One to Carry On (both parts). It also included information on the voice actors, character designs, and a layout of the Tendo dojo.

Additionally, guidebooks were released for three of the Ranma ½ video games; these included not only strategies, but also interviews. Two books including interviews with the cast of the live-action TV drama, and some select stories, were released in 2011.

The music from the Ranma ½ TV series, films and OVAs have been released on various CDs. Four from the TV series, two from the first film, one from the second, one from the third film and OVAs, and three compiling the music by DoCo used in the OVAs. DoCo is a pop group composed of the anime's main female characters' voice actresses. Several compilation albums were also released, some composed of the opening and closing theme songs and others of image songs. Many of the image songs were first released as singles.

Reception

By November 2006, it was reported that Ranma ½ had sold over 49 million manga volumes in Japan. Shogakukan has printed 53 million copies as of November 2011. And by April 2021 it had 55 million copies in circulation.

The Ranma ½ anime was ranked number 17 on Anime Insiders 2001 list of the Top 50 Anime, although the list was limited to series that were released in North America. It ranked 36th on TV Asahi's 2006 list of Japan's 100 favorite animated TV series, which is based on an online poll of the Japanese people, up from the previous year's list where it ranked 45th. In November 2006, the New York Comic Con announced that it would host the first-ever American Anime Awards. Fans had the chance to vote for their favorite anime online during the month of January 2007. Only the five nominees receiving the most votes for each category were announced on February 5. Among the 12 different categories, Ranma ½ was voted into the "Best Comedy Anime" category, and the Ranma ½ OVAs were voted into the "Best Short Series" category. A 2019 NHK poll of 210,061 people saw Ranma ½ and Ranma ½ Nettōhen named Takahashi's second best-animated work. Shampoo and Ranma were voted fourth and fifth place respectively in her characters category.

Although Lum from Takahashi's first series Urusei Yatsura is often cited as the first tsundere character in anime and manga, Theron Martin of Anime News Network stated that Ranma ½s Akane Tendo is closer to how they would later typically be portrayed in the 2000s. He also suggested that one could argue Ranma is an early example of a harem or reverse harem series, due to the main character attracting suitors in both genders. The series's publication in North America proved highly successful as well, being many Americans' first introduction to manga and its anime adaptation one of the first Japanese animation shows to achieve popularity in the US. In an overview of the series, Jason Thompson called Ranma ½ "the direct ancestor of all comedy-action manga, like Sumomomo Momomo and History's Strongest Disciple Kenichi", although noted that it was not the first, but only spanned the period when manga and anime sales were at their height. Relating it to Takahashi's other works, he summed the series up as "At the start, the fighting is minimal and it's almost a semi-serious relationship comedy, like Maison Ikkoku; then it turns completely ridiculous; and by the climax, when Ranma fights the evil bird-people of Phoenix Mountain in an excessively long and un-funny fight scene, it's like a warmup for Inuyasha." Reviewing the final volume of the manga, Anime News Network remarked that "Every dimension of Rumiko Takahashi's storytelling skills come into play here: comedy, romance and introspection, and of course, high-flying fantasy martial-arts action." However, they felt some of the action scenes were hard to follow and noted that the mirroring to left-to-right format caused errors with the art.

In their review of Viz Media's season five DVD box set, Anime News Network praised the Japanese cast's performance and the animation, but criticized the English version's slight script changes and minor voice actors while praising its main cast. They also remarked that while Ranma ½ is a classic, after a hundred episodes, the same jokes are just not funny anymore. THEM Anime Reviews''' Raphael See called the television series and the OVAs "one of the funniest things [he's] ever seen, anime or otherwise" and also praised the English dub as some of the best. However, he was much more critical of the first two films particularly for both using the same damsel in distress plot. Mike Toole of Anime News Network included Big Trouble in Nekronon, China at number 83 on The Other 100 Best Anime Movies of All Time, a list of "lesser-known, lesser-loved classics," calling it "a solid action-comedy and a good, well-rounded example of the appeal of Ranma ½"

Legacy
Hiroshi Aro admitted that he created Futaba-kun Change! based on Ranma ½. Western comic book artists that have cited Ranma ½ as an influence include Canadian Bryan Lee O'Malley on his series Scott Pilgrim and American Colleen Coover on her erotic series Small Favors.

Film director Makoto Shinkai mentioned that Ranma ½ served as an inspiration for the 2016 animation film Your Name. Matt Bozon, creator of the Shantae video game series, cited Ranma ½ as a big influence on his work. The title of the fourth game, Shantae:  Genie Hero, is also a tribute to the series.

References

External links

 Shōnen Sunday Museum 
 Ranma ½ at Viz Media 
  at Viz
 Madman Entertainment
 
 J-pop.com review of Ranma ½'' music

 
1987 manga
1989 Japanese television series endings
1989 anime television series debuts
1991 anime films
1992 Japanese television series endings
1992 anime films
1994 anime films
1996 comics endings
2010s Japanese films
2011 television films
Adventure anime and manga
Anime films based on manga
Animated television series about dysfunctional families
Chinese mythology in anime and manga
Fiction about shapeshifting
Fuji TV original programming
Live-action films based on manga
Madman Entertainment anime
Manga adapted into films
Martial arts anime and manga
Martial arts television series
Nikkatsu films
Nippon TV dramas
Romantic comedy anime and manga
Shogakukan manga
Shōnen manga
Studio Deen
Viz Media anime
Viz Media manga
Works by Rumiko Takahashi